Nnaemeka is a given name by the Igbo tribe in Nigeria.
The name Nnaemeka means 'God has done a lot'. It is also synonymous to the name Chukwuemeka, since Chukwu is also known as God in the Igbo language. Notable people with the name include:

Nnaemeka Ajuru (born 1986), Nigerian footballer
Nnaemeka Anyanwu (born 1988), Nigerian footballer

African given names